The Corps Masovia Königsberg is the only remaining academic student corps from the Albertus University in Königsberg. In 2001 Masovia was re-established in Potsdam.

History

The Mazovian people represented a unique minority. They were Lutheran Protestants, commonly spoke Polish and devoted themselves to the Prussian kings. Even after the Second World War they declared themselves as Germans. The Protestant pastors, many of them corps members, helped to preserve this heritage.

In the 19th century most corps members came from and returned to the remote and poor, but wonderful land. 500 corps members had had their education in Lyck and Rastenburg.   
The Mazovian people considered the Corps Masovia as theirs and took over the blue-white-red flag. In 1855 Friedrich Dewischeit, a Mazovian teacher, composed songs about Masovia. Dedicated to the Corps Masovia, the Masurenlied still is the hymn of the Mazovian people.

The Corps Masovia was founded in June 1830 and until 1935 played an important role at the Königsberg university. On occasion of the centenary in 1930, the Mazovian mayors donated a library cupboard with the arm coats of their 30 towns.

Prussian heritage

In East Prussia many pastors, teachers, judges, physicians, civil servants and mayors proudly showed Masovia's colours, i.e. light blue, white and fire-red. 15 members of the Prussian Parliament (Abgeordnetenhaus) were corps members, three conservatives and twelve liberals. Two sat in the Prussian House of Lords, four in the Reichstag. Jews and Catholic priests, French and Polish members illustrate Masovia's unconstricted freedom of spirit.

115 corps members fell in both world wars. In the First World War six obtained the Königliche Hausorden von Hohenzollern (prestage of the Pour le Mérite). In the Second World War three had the Knight's Cross of the Iron Cross, one with Oak Leaves.

In 1935 Masovia had to resign herself to the Nazi rules of academic life.

In January 1950 Masovia joined the Corps Palaiomarchia which had been expelled from Halle (Saale) and restituted in Kiel. When it became evident that this had not been a formal restitution Masovia re-established herself in Potsdam, just 300 years after Prussia becoming a kingdom.

Members
 Horst Ademeit, Major, Knight Cross of the Iron Cross with Oak Leaves
 Gustav Adolf Bergenroth, historian
 Erich Bloedorn, Colonel, Knight Cross of the Iron Cross
 Rüdiger Döhler, Professor of Orthopaedic Surgery
 Gustav Gisevius (1810-1848), pastor in Mazovia
 Ferdinand Gregorovius, historian, honorary citizen of Rome
 Paul Hensel (politician), campaigner for Mazovia
 Jürgen Herrlein, lawyer
 Otto Hesse. Professor of Mathematics in Heidelberg
 Goetz Oertel, physicist, member of National Academy of Sciences
 Friedrich Julius Richelot, Professor of Mathematics in Königsberg
 Ernst Reinhold Schmidt, leader of the German immigrants in Philadelphia, author of The American Civil War (1867)
 André Rüdiger Simon, surgeon at the Imperial College London
 Karl Ludwig Stellmacher (1909-2001), Professor of Mathematics, University of Maryland
 Arthur Zimmermann, Secretary of State

See also

 Masurians
 Mazovia

Masovia, Corps
University of Potsdam alumni
Student organizations established in 1823
Sports clubs established in the 1800s
Königsberg
History of Potsdam